The Changsang Line is an electrified freight-only railway line of the Korean State Railway in South P'yŏngan Province, North Korea, running from Hyangjang on the P'yŏngdŏk Line to Changsang.

History
On 21 June 1940, the West Chosen Central Railway, which since 1939 had been operating a line between Sŭnghori and P'yŏngnam Kangdong, received approval from the Railway Bureau of the Government-General of Korea to build a line to the Changsang coal fields via Tŏkch'ŏn; the Chosen Anthracite Company had opened mines around Changsang and Tŏkch'ŏn in 1938

From Tŏkch'ŏn, which it had reached in the summer of 1945, the West Chosen Central Railway planned its Tŏkpal Line line to run from Tŏkch'ŏn to Kujang via Changsangri (today's Changsang Station), to connect there with the Chosen Government Railway's Manp'o Line. However, the terrain proved too difficult, and, after adding a signal station at Hyangjang between Hyangwŏn and Changsangri, construction on the current alignment of the line to Kujang began. However, this wasn't completed before the end of the Pacific War, and it was only after the end of the Korean War that the connection to Kujang and the Manp'o Line was finally made.

After the partition of Korea following Japan's defeat in the war, all railways in North Korea were nationalised and made part of the Korean State Railway. The P'yŏngyang Colliery Line (P'yŏngyang–Sinsŏngch'ŏn) and the former West Chosen Central Railway mainline (Sinsŏngch'ŏn–Tŏkch'ŏn) were joined together to form the P'yŏngdŏk Line; after the Tŏkpal Line was extended to Kujang after the end of the Korean War, it was later merged with the P'yŏngdŏk Line, but the line's name was not changed, while the Hyangjang–Changsangri section became the Changsang Line. Electrification of the line was completed in June 1979.

Route 

A yellow background in the "Distance" box indicates that section of the line is not electrified.

References

Railway lines in North Korea
Standard gauge railways in North Korea
Railway lines opened in 1945